Inbreeding the Anthropophagi is the second full-length album by the American death metal band Deeds of Flesh. It was originally released in 1998 on CD through Displeased Records, and was later reissued by Unique Leader Records, a company founded and managed by members of the band.

The album revolves around the legend of Sawney Bean and his family, telling of their cave-dwelling existence and grisly practice of attacking travellers on local roads for food and profit.

Track listing

Personnel

Musicians
Jacoby Kingston - Bass, vocals
Erik Lindmark - Guitar, vocals
Brad Palmer - Drums

Guest musicians
Matti Way (ex-Disgorge) - Backing vocals

Production
Recorded at Moon Studios
Produced by Deeds of Flesh
Tomas E. Gingle - Engineering and effects

1998 albums
Deeds of Flesh albums